The 4th constituency of Essonne is a French legislative constituency in the Essonne département.

Description

The borders of the 4th constituency of Essonne have changed radically as a result of increase in the number of seats in the department. Prior to 1986 the seat covered the western edge of Essonne and included only one canton Limours that is within the boundaries of the seat today.

The seat is a mix of the more rural cantons of Limours and Montlhéry along with the southern fringes of the Paris suburbs around Villebon-sur-Yvette.

Politically the seat has changed substantially from a marginal profile prior to 1986 to a conservative stronghold. The seat's former representative Nathalie Kosciusko-Morizet is a former minister, spokesperson for Nicolas Sarkozy and candidate for Mayor of Paris.

Historic Representation

Election results

2022

 
 
 
 
 
 
 
|-
| colspan="8" bgcolor="#E9E9E9"|
|-

2017

 
 
 
 
 
 
 
 
 
|-
| colspan="8" bgcolor="#E9E9E9"|
|-

2012

 
 
 
 
 
|-
| colspan="8" bgcolor="#E9E9E9"|
|-

2007

 
 
 
 
 
 
 
|-
| colspan="8" bgcolor="#E9E9E9"|
|-

2002

 
 
 
 
 
 
|-
| colspan="8" bgcolor="#E9E9E9"|
|-

1997

 
 
 
 
 
 
 
 
 
 
|-
| colspan="8" bgcolor="#E9E9E9"|
|-

Sources

Official results of French elections from 2002: "Résultats électoraux officiels en France" (in French).

4